Graham Charles Lay (Willesden, Greater London, UK, 19 January 1960 – 27 November 2016) was a British antiques expert specialising in arms, armour and militaria, and military history, probably best known for his many appearances on BBC TVs Antiques Roadshow television programme, where he had been one of the team of experts since 1988. He was regularly seen wearing a 'Blue Peter' badge.

He appeared as an expert on other BBC TV antiques programmes such as 20th Century Roadshow, Priceless Antiques Roadshow and Bargain Hunt. In Series 1, episode 6 of 20th Century Roadshow, recorded at Imperial War Museum Duxford, he valued a World War II Spitfire MkIX aircraft at between £1,000,000 and £1,500,000: the highest price for anything ever valued on the show.

Books 
He contributed to several books such as Antiques Roadshow Collectables, and wrote auction reviews and articles for newspapers and periodicals, including writing for Black Powder, the magazine of the Muzzle Loaders Association of Great Britain.

Personal life

Death 
He died at the end of 2016 having suffered from cystic fibrosis since birth and he was remembered in the Antiques Roadshow highlights special on 28 December 2016, shown on BBC1.

References

1960 births
2016 deaths
Antiques experts